Narandanda is a village in Sri Lanka. It is located within Central Province.

See also
List of towns in Central Province, Sri Lanka
A village in Pallegampaha korale, Lower Dumbara, on the Narandanda-oya/Rawana-oya.

External links

Populated places in Kandy District